The 1976 St Albans City and District Council election took place on 6 May 1976 to elect members of St Albans City and District Council in England. This was on the same day as other local elections.

Summary

|}

References

St Albans
St Albans City and District Council elections
1970s in Hertfordshire